Little Flock is a city in Benton County, Arkansas, United States. The population was 2,585 at the 2010 census.  It is part of the Northwest Arkansas region.

Geography
Little Flock is located on a tributary of Little Sugar Creek approximately two miles north of Rogers.

Demographics

2020 census

As of the 2020 United States census, there were 3,055 people, 1,136 households, and 686 families residing in the city.

2010 census
As of the census of 2010, there were 2,585 people, in 1,126 households with 99.0% of the population in households.  The racial makeup of the population was 76.1% non-Hispanic white, 2.5% black or African American, 1.9% Native American, 4.3% Asian, 0.3% Pacific Islander, 0.1% non-Hispanic from some other race, 3.5% from two or more races and 12.3% Hispanic or Latino.

2000 census
In 2000 there were 1,016 households, and 685 families residing in the city. The racial makeup of the city was 83.21% White, 0.89% Black or African American, 1.70% Native American, 5.65% Asian, 0.43% Pacific Islander, 5.88% from other races, and 2.24% from two or more races.  15.98% of the population were Hispanic or Latino of any race.

There were 1,016 households, out of which 37.3% had children under the age of 18 living with them, 54.7% were married couples living together, 9.1% had a female householder with no husband present, and 32.5% were non-families. 26.9% of all households were made up of individuals, and 3.4% had someone living alone who was 65 years of age or older.  The average household size was 2.52 and the average family size was 3.06.

In the city, the population was spread out, with 27.7% under the age of 18, 16.3% from 18 to 24, 33.2% from 25 to 44, 16.5% from 45 to 64, and 6.4% who were 65 years of age or older.  The median age was 28 years. For every 100 females, there were 109.3 males.  For every 100 females age 18 and over, there were 107.1 males.

The median income for a household in the city was $32,768, and the median income for a family was $38,456. Males had a median income of $28,661 versus $21,708 for females. The per capita income for the city was $16,447.  About 10.2% of families and 13.1% of the population were below the poverty line, including 17.4% of those under age 18 and 3.4% of those age 65 or over.

Education 
Public education for elementary and secondary students within the majority of Little Flock is provided by Rogers Public Schools. Small sections of Little Flock are zoned to Bentonville School District and Pea Ridge School District.

The Bentonville district portion is zoned to the following schools: Apple Glen Elementary School, Ruth Barker Middle School, Washington Junior High School, and Bentonville High School.

References

Cities in Benton County, Arkansas
Cities in Arkansas
Northwest Arkansas